Heale's Lock is a lock on the Kennet and Avon Canal, between Thatcham and Woolhampton, Berkshire, England.

Heale's Lock was built between 1718 and 1723 under the supervision of the engineer John Hore of Newbury. The canal is administered by the Canal & River Trust. The lock has a rise/fall of 8 ft 11 in (2.72 m)., and was originally a turf lock, being rebuilt as a conventional lock in the late 1980s.

References

External links
Woolhampton and Heale's Locks on www.tonycanalpics.co.uk

See also

Locks on the Kennet and Avon Canal

Locks on the Kennet and Avon Canal
Locks of Berkshire